Baptist Bible College Canada and Theological Seminary was a college Baptist school and seminary established by Dr. Harry Strachan Sr. in 1978. 

The college operated a distance education school training pastors for Baptist churches in Canada and elsewhere.

Status
In 1984, the Ontario legislature officially recognized the seminary as a degree-granting institution through the passage of "An Act to Incorporate Baptist Bible College Canada and Theological Seminary, 1984".

In December 31, 2017, Baptist Bible College Canada was closed.

Governance
The seminary was governed by a board of trustees, roughly half of which is made up of members and officials of the Bethel Baptist Church, and a Senate composed of the faculty, school administrators and several trustees.

Academic programs

Undergraduate Programs:
 Associate of Theology Diploma (2 years)
 Associate of Religious Education Diploma (2 years)
 Graduate of Theology Diploma (3 years)
 Graduate of Religious Education Diploma (3 years)
 Bachelor of Theology Degree (Th.B.) (4 years)
 Bachelor of Religious Education Degree (B.R.E.) (4 years)

Graduate Programs include:
 Master of Religious Education Degree (M.R.E.)
 Master of Theology Degree (Th.M.)

Post Graduate Programs include:
 Doctor of Religious Education Degree (D.R.E.)
 Doctor of Theology Degree (Th.D.)

References

Baptist seminaries and theological colleges in Canada
Education in Norfolk County, Ontario
Defunct universities and colleges in Canada
Defunct Christian universities and colleges